Clopenthixol (Sordinol), also known as clopentixol, is a typical antipsychotic drug of the thioxanthene class. It was introduced by Lundbeck in 1961.

Clopenthixol is a mixture of cis and trans isomers. Zuclopenthixol, the pure cis isomer, was later introduced by Lundbeck in 1962, and has been much more widely used. Both drugs are equally effective as antipsychotics and have similar adverse effect profiles, but clopenthixol is half as active on a milligram-to-milligram basis and appears to produce more sedation in comparison.

Clopenthixol is not approved for use in the United States.

See also 
 Typical antipsychotic
 Thioxanthene

References

External links 
 

Piperazines
Chloroarenes
Primary alcohols
Thioxanthene antipsychotics